Bushra Amiwala is a Pakistani-American college student, at DePaul University, and as of April 2019 she is the youngest Muslim elected official in the United States. Amiwala was a Democratic candidate for the Cook County Board of Commissioners in the 2018 Illinois Primary Election. She lost to the then 16-year incumbent Larry Suffredin in the Democratic primary election on March 20, 2018. Suffredin then encouraged Amiwala to run for public office shortly after when she announced her candidacy for D73.5 Board of Education, and was elected in April 2019. Amiwala also became the first Muslim person elected to the board of education seat in her district. In February 2020, Bushra Amiwala was awarded the Asian American Coalition of Chicago (AACC) award for exemplary community service and youth excellence.

Biography 
Amiwala was born in Chicago and lived in the Rogers Park area until she was 10. Her family then moved to Skokie, where she graduated from Niles North High School. She began her political career as an intern for Republican senator Mark Kirk, and was encouraged by her field office manager, Benjamin Polony, to run her own campaign for the Cook County Board of Commissioners as a college freshman. She came in second in the Democratic primaries, earning 14,988 votes, a total of 30.6% of the vote in a three-person race.

Amiwala began an annual service project on her birthday, and in 2018 made and distributed hundreds of care packages in the Chicago area with Congresswoman Jan Schakowsky, who endorsed her campaign. Amiwala was named one of Glamour Magazine's 2018 College Women of the Year.

Amiwala is an avid public speaker and has spoken in many events such as TEDxDePaul University and Harvard University to name a few. She is one of the subjects of an original documentary called And She Could Be Next on PBS. She is also the female candidate on Amazon Prime's RUN The Series. She is currently the subject of an original Hulu documentary called Our America: Women Forward.

References 

Year of birth missing (living people)
Living people
Politicians from Chicago
Women in Illinois politics
American politicians of Pakistani descent
21st-century American women